Harvey Alfred Miller (October 19, 1928, Sturgis, Michigan – January 7, 2020, Palm Bay, Florida) was an American botanist, specializing in Pacific Islands bryophytes.

Biography
After graduating from Sturgis High School in 1946, Miller matriculated at the University of Michigan, where he graduated in 1950 with a B.S. in botany. He graduated in botany in 1952 from the University of Hawaii with an M.S. and in 1957 from Stanford University with a Ph.D. As a postdoc he was an instructor at the University of Massachusetts. During the 1950s and until 1967 he was on the faculty of Ohio's Miami University, where he achieved the rank of associate professor. In 1968 he was a professor at Washington State University, where he became chair of the botany department. He later became professor and chair at Florida Technological University (which in 1978 was renamed the University of Central Florida). He held visiting professorships at the University of Guam and the University of Illinois. He was an adjunct professor at the University of West Alabama, Seminole State College of Florida, and Miami University (in Ohio). He was the author or coauthor of over 100 research articles. Miller was a licensed private plane pilot and had his first flying lessons when he was 14 years old.

Miller was a 1958 Guggenheim Fellow, a fellow of the American Association for the Advancement of Science, and served as president of the American Bryological and Lichenological Society (1964–1965) and president of the Florida Academy of Sciences (1981).

Upon his death, Miller was survived by his widow, a daughter, a son, and three step-children.

Selected publications

Articles
  1953
  1956
  1958
  1959
  1960
  1960
  1960
  1968
 
 
 
  1988

Books and monographs

References

External links
 
 

1928 births
2020 deaths
20th-century American botanists
21st-century American botanists
Bryologists
University of Michigan alumni
University of Hawaiʻi alumni
Stanford University alumni
Miami University faculty
Washington State University faculty
University of Central Florida faculty
Fellows of the American Association for the Advancement of Science
Fellows of the Linnean Society of London
People from Sturgis, Michigan